Güell or Guell may refer to:

Bodegas Güell, architectural complex in Garraf, Sitges (Barcelona) designed by Antoni Gaudí
Church of Colònia Güell, unfinished work by Antoni Gaudí
Corwin C. Guell, member of the Wisconsin State Assembly
Eusebi Güell (1846–1918), Catalan entrepreneur who profited from the industrial revolution in Catalonia in the late 19th century
Güell, river in Catalonia, Spain
Gonzalo Güell (1895–1985), Cuban lawyer, Foreign Minister of Cuba 1956–1959 and Prime Minister of Cuba 1958–1959
Güell Pavilions, complex of buildings near Pedralbes, Barcelona, by the architect Antoni Gaudí, built between 1884 and 1887
Palau Güell, mansion in Barcelona, Catalonia, Spain designed by Antoni Gaudí for the Catalan industrial tycoon Eusebi Güell
Park Güell, garden complex with architectural elements on the hill of El Carmel in the Gràcia district of Barcelona, Catalonia, Spain

See also
Cuello
Geulle
Guella
Quella